Cyprus competed at the 2020 Summer Paralympics in Tokyo, Japan, from 24 August to 5 September 2021. This was the island country's ninth consecutive appearance in a Summer Paralympiad having made its debut at the 1988 Summer Paralympics.

Medalists

Athletics

Powerlifting

Swimming 

One Cypriot female athlete has successfully entered the paralympic slot after breaking the MQS.

References 

Nations at the 2020 Summer Paralympics
2020
Summer Paralympics